The Lorax is a musical Dr. Seuss animated short produced by DePatie–Freleng Enterprises which first aired as a television special on CBS in the United States on February 14 (Valentine's Day), 1972, and in Canada on CBC Television on October 22, 1972. The special was written by Theodor Geisel, based on his 1971 book of the same name.

Plot 
One night, a young boy living in a polluted, grim ghost town wanders down 'The Street of the Lifted Lorax'. Along the dark street, he comes to the residence of a man named The Once-ler, a man in dark green-colored gloves whose face is never seen. He takes up an audience with the boy, and begins to explain the tale regarding the Lorax.

The land once thrived with Truffula trees when the Once-ler first came to the area in a horse-drawn cart. Living among the foliage were the brown Bar-ba-Loots, who ate Truffula fruit from the local trees. In the nearby pond lived the Humming Fish, and  the Swomee Swans flew overhead. The trees amazed the Once-ler with their texture and scent, and he soon built a small shop in the area. After cutting down a Truffula tree, the Lorax popped out of its stump. The Lorax claims to speak for the trees, and demanded to know what the Once-ler was doing. The Once-ler explained that he was using the Truffula tree's tufts to make something called a "Thneed... a fine something that all people need". He insisted that he was only cutting one tree down and causing no harm, but when the Thneed sold quickly, the Once-ler began cutting down Truffula trees en masse to make more Thneeds. It is also noted that the Truffula tree grows extremely slowly—ten years before the seed even becomes a sapling and at least ten years after that to grow to maturity—making farming the tree impractical. Soon, he called his relatives to help him grow his thriving business into a boomtown. As the Lorax protested against the Once-ler's actions, a bulldozer picked up the Truffula tree where he stood and the Lorax was thrown into a truck with the Truffula tree and caught in an assembly line.

Some time later, at a major celebration, everybody reminisced about how Thneeds, Inc. started and how famous the Once-ler had become and how it had diversified, showing "Once-ler Cones", "Once-ler Burgers", a "Once-lermobile" and a blimp advertising Thneeds, then a stone with the word "Thneed" carved in it. Shortly after Thneeds, Inc. had produced its millionth product, the Lorax got out of the box and, despite his protests, fell back into the box to be shipped off with more finished Thneeds. All the while, the air was becoming increasingly polluted and darker as the industrialization progressed, the countless accumulated garbage was being dumped in rivers, and the few remaining Truffula trees were wilting.

The Lorax continued to fight the Once-Ler. By this point the Lorax had to send the starving Brown Bar-ba-loots out of the area in search of food. After this, the Once-ler had his first bout with a guilty conscience; he justified his doubts by remarking "But if I didn't do them, then someone else would". The Lorax then protested that the smog was suffocating the Swomee Swans, preventing them from singing, and thus the Lorax also had to send them away. The Once-ler protested that closing the factory would put countless employees out of work; the Lorax conceded that he had no answer to that. Finally, the pond that was home to the Humming Fish was filled with viscous toxic waste clogging the fish's gills and rivaling Lake Erie; they too were sent away over dry land. Confronted by the Lorax, the Once-ler appeared to be ready to act, until his secretary announced that the company's stock had shot upward. The elated Once-ler flipped from empathy to defiance, vowing to ramp up production even further—until at that moment, with the sound of an ax, the last remaining tree was cut down. With no raw materials, the factory was forced to close anyway, and the Once-ler's relatives all sadly departed. The Lorax glared at the Once-ler before he lifted himself by the seat of his pants, and disappeared through a tiny hole in the smog. On the spot where the Lorax last stood sits a small pile of rocks, with a word carved into one of them: "Unless".

The tale then switches back to the Once-ler talking to the boy. The Once-ler finally figures out that the word "Unless" was actually meant for whoever listened to the story and "cares a whole awful lot" to undo the damage the Once-ler caused. The Once-ler gives the boy the last Truffula seed and encourages him to help revitalize the long-dead trees by growing a brand new forest, with the possibility that the Lorax and all of his friends may then come back. The final scene shows the hole in the smog has grown larger, a sign of hope as the special ends.

Cast 
 Eddie Albert – Narrator
 Bob Holt – The Lorax, the Once-ler
 Athena Lorde – Miss O'Schmunsler
 Harlen Carraher – Boy
 Thurl Ravenscroft – Singer

Home media 
The Lorax was released on VHS in 1994 as part of a CBS Video four-tape package called "Dr. Seuss Sing-Along Classics".

In 2003, Universal Studios Family Productions got the rights to the original 1972 TV special, and Universal released The Lorax on DVD under its home video label, Universal Pictures Home Entertainment, with newly remastered picture and sound. This release also included another special Pontoffel Pock, Where Are You? as an extra.

To tie-in with the 40th anniversary of the special and the release of film The Lorax, Warner Home Video released the special on a deluxe edition DVD and Blu-ray on February 14 (Valentine's Day), 2012. This release once again included Pontoffel Pock, Where Are You? and now also included The Butter Battle Book as another extra (however, when The Lorax was released on digital retailer sites in 2021, the two extras were taken out of the release and moved over to being included with the digital retailer release of Green Eggs and Ham and Other Treats, where they were restored in high definition).

Reception 
The Lorax received the Critics Award from the International Animated Cartoon Festival (Zagreb, 1972) and the Silver Media from the International Film and Television Festival (New York, 1972).

References

External links 
 

1972 television specials
1972 animated films
1972 films
Dr. Seuss television specials
Television shows written by Dr. Seuss
CBS television specials
1970s children's fantasy films
CBS original programming
1970s animated television specials
American animated fantasy films
Musical television specials
Environmental films
Television specials by DePatie–Freleng Enterprises
1970s American animated films
Films scored by Dean Elliott
Films directed by Hawley Pratt

de:Der Lorax#Verfilmung von 1972